Max Elliott Slade (born July 4, 1980) is an American former child actor who starred in 3 Ninjas, 3 Ninjas Knuckle Up, and 3 Ninjas Kick Back  as the character named Jeffrey Douglas, later nicknamed Colt by his grandfather Mori Tanaka. He was the middle child of the Douglas family in the films. He was featured as Jay Lovell in Apollo 13, young Mark Goddard in The Sweeper, and young Gil Buckman in Parenthood.

Slade earned a brown belt in Gosoku-ryū karate at age 11.

Slade began his acting career in 1989 playing Young Gil Buckman in Parenthood. In 1990, he played Kevin Buckman in twelve episodes of Parenthood. In 1991, he played Willy in the made-for-TV film To the Moon, Alice. In 1992, he played Jeffrey Colt Douglas in 3 Ninjas; he reprised the role in 3 Ninjas Knuckle Up and 3 Ninjas Kick Back, which were released in 1994 and 1995 respectively. Though the latter was released last, it was the second film of the series to be made and is the second chronologically. In 1995, he played Jay Lovell in Apollo 13. Afterwards, he played Mark in the direct-to-TV film The Sweeper.

Filmography

References

External links

Max Elliott Slade on Twitter
Max Elliott Slade on Myspace
Podcast Interview 2017
Official Vishuda website

1980 births
Living people
20th-century American male actors
American male child actors
American male film actors
American male karateka
Male actors from Pasadena, California
University of Southern California alumni